Robert Curtis Retherford (1912–1981) was an American physicist. He was a graduate student of Willis Lamb at Columbia Radiation Laboratory. Retherford and Lamb performed the famous experiment revealing Lamb shift in the fine structure of hydrogen, a decisive experimental step toward a new understanding of quantum electrodynamics.

See also

Quantum electrodynamics
Lamb shift

References

20th-century American physicists
1912 births
1981 deaths
Columbia University alumni